Anthony Benna (born September 25, 1987) is a French freestyle skier, specializing in  moguls.

Benna competed at the 2010 and 2014 Winter Olympics for France. He did not advance to the moguls final in either case, with best finish 23rd in 2014.

Benna's greatest achievement has been winning gold at the 2015 World Championships moguls event, with his previous best finish at the World Championships being 16th in 2007.

Benna made his World Cup debut in February 2005. As of January 2015, he has finished on the podium at World Cup events four times. His best finish is a silver in a dual moguls event at Meribel in 2011. His best World Cup moguls overall standing was 5th in 2009.

World Cup Podiums

References

1987 births
Living people
Olympic freestyle skiers of France
Freestyle skiers at the 2010 Winter Olympics
Freestyle skiers at the 2014 Winter Olympics
Freestyle skiers at the 2018 Winter Olympics
Sportspeople from Haute-Savoie
French male freestyle skiers